Sir Graham Holbrook Fry, KCMG (born 20 December 1949) was British High Commissioner to Malaysia from 1998 to 2001 and British Ambassador to Japan from 2004 to 2008.

Fry was born on 20 December 1949. He was educated at Montpelier prep school at Paignton, Devon, and graduated from Brasenose College, Oxford University and joined the Foreign and Commonwealth Office in 1972. Following language courses at the University of Sheffield and Kamakura he became 2nd Secretary at the British Embassy in Japan in 1974.

Further appointments included the British Embassy Paris and Director, North Asian and Pacific of the Foreign and Commonwealth Office. He was High Commissioner to Malaysia from 1998 to 2001. In 2004 he was appointed Ambassador to Japan  and he was knighted in the New Year Honours 2006 list. His wife is Lady Toyoko Fry. He has two sons, Gerald and Kenzo. Fry retired from the Diplomatic Service in July 2008. Fry has been a director of the Wildfowl and Wetlands Trust in the period, 2010–2012.

References

External links
FCO Image of Fry
The Japan Society Image of Fry

Knights Commander of the Order of St Michael and St George
Ambassadors of the United Kingdom to Japan
High Commissioners of the United Kingdom to Malaysia
Living people
1949 births
Place of birth missing (living people)
Alumni of Brasenose College, Oxford
20th-century British diplomats
21st-century British diplomats